Discinella is a genus of fungi in the family Helotiaceae. The genus, which contains an estimated 12 species, was circumscribed by Jean Louis Émile Boudier in 1885.

Species

References

Helotiaceae
Taxa named by Jean Louis Émile Boudier
Taxa described in 1885